Indy Groothuizen (born 22 July 1996) is a Dutch professional footballer who plays as a goalkeeper for AB.

Club career
Groothuizen is a youth exponent from AFC Ajax. He made his professional debut at Jong Ajax on 8 December 2014 in an Eerste Divisie game against RKC Waalwijk. He replaced an injured Norbert Alblas after 88 minutes in a 3–2 home win.

On 31 July 2019, Groothuizen joined Danish 1st Division club Vejle Boldklub on a contract until June 2022. After two years in Denmark, Groothuizen returned to the Netherlands, signing a one-year deal on 14 July 2021 with FC Emmen with an option for one further year.

On 10 January 2023, Groothuizen joined Danish 2nd Division club AB.

International career
Groothuizen scored for the Netherlands U-20 in a November 2015 friendly against Czech Republic U-20.

Career statistics

References

1996 births
Living people
Dutch footballers
Sportspeople from Alkmaar
Footballers from North Holland
Netherlands youth international footballers
AFC '34 players
AFC Ajax players
Jong Ajax players
FC Nordsjælland players
ADO Den Haag players
Vejle Boldklub players
FC Emmen players
Akademisk Boldklub players
Eredivisie players
Eerste Divisie players
Danish Superliga players
Dutch expatriate footballers
Expatriate men's footballers in Denmark
Dutch expatriate sportspeople in Denmark
Association football goalkeepers